Mohamed Haddad may refer to:

 Mohamed Ryad Ben Haddad (born 1959), Algerian hurdler
 Mohamed Haddad (boxer) (born 1960), Syrian boxer